The Germany national roller hockey team is the national team side of Germany at international roller hockey. Usually is part of FIRS Roller Hockey World Cup and CERH European Roller Hockey Championship.

Germany squad – 64th Nations Cup 

Team Staff
 General Manager: Björn Siebel
 General Manager: Christian Baumgart
 Physiotherapist: Nadine Schlesinger 	

Coaching Staff
 Head Coach: Sven Steup
 Assistant: Martin Schmahl

References

External links
Official website of Germany Roller Sports Federation

National Roller Hockey Team
Roller hockey
National roller hockey (quad) teams